Bastard Swordsman, also known as Reincarnate Swordsman, is a 1983 Hong Kong wuxia film produced by the Shaw Brothers Studio.

Plot
Yun Fei Yang is the viciously bullied orphan who takes on the unpleasant tasks at a formidable kung-fu school. Constantly mocked by the other students of the school, Yun counts as his only friend the daughter of the resident master. Any internal wrangling between the various members is put to one side when a swordsman from a rival clan reminds the master of the duel he must take part in once a decade. Unfortunately the defending clan chief is well aware that his rival is more powerful than himself. The expected defeat is further complicated when a wandering swordsman arrives on the scene and joins himself to the injured party, immediately adding to Yun's woes. The ensuing series of confrontations and intrigues soon reveals the individual motives that the numerous parties all have and the role they play in the fate of the martial world. After finally understanding his own past and upbringing, Yun is ready to take on the mantle of avenger for his school and win back the respect that his colleagues have lost. With fighting skills that had been taught to him by a shrouded figure, Yun steps out of the shadows and reveals himself to be anything but the harassed orphan that everyone enjoys picking on. However to have any kind of hope against his nearly superhuman foes, the young fighter must uncover the secrets of his clan's 'Silkworm Technique' and transform himself completely.

Cast
Norman Chui as Yun Fei Yang
Tony Liu as Fu Yu Shu
Wong Yung as Chief Qing Song
Leanne Liu as Lun Wan Er
Alex Man as Chief Dugu Wu Di
Yeung Jing-jing as Dugu Fang Er
Chan Si-gai as Shen Man Jiun
Ku Kuan-chung as Bai Sek
Lo Mang as Kung Suen Wang
Kwan Fung as Lightning
Yuen Qiu as Rain
Yuen Tak as Wind
Wong Lik as Thunder
Wilson Tong as Yen Zhong Tian
Lau Siu-gwan as Yao Feng
Sun Chien as Xie Ping
Tong Chun-chung as Jin Sek
Siao Yuk as Yu Sek
Chan Shen as Guardian of the Law
Wong Ching-ho as Guardian of the Law
Chan Yuet-yue as Invincible Clan Chief
Chan Lau as Invincible Clan Chief
Pak Sha-lik as Invincible Clan Chief
Yiu Man-gei as Invincible Clan Chief
Cheung Chok-chow as Invincible Clan Chief
Shum Lo as Thundering Prognosticator
Lam Chi-tai as Qing Song's servant
Ngai Tim-choi as Qing Song's servant
Lui Tat as Wu Dang member
Wan Seung-lam as Wu Dang member
Kong Long as Wu Dang member
Cheung Sek-au as monk
Gam Tin-chue as extra
Ma Zongde

Production
Bastard Swordsman is based on the 1979 ATV television series Reincarnated (a.k.a. The Transformation of the Heavenly Silkworm). The story was originally a script for the television series, but later converted into a wuxia novel by Huang Ying.

External links 
 

1983 films
Hong Kong martial arts films
Wuxia films
Shaw Brothers Studio films
Funimation
1980s Hong Kong films